L'Opus Dei : enquête sur le "monstre" (English: Opus Dei: Inquiry into the "Monster") is a French-language journalistic and historical work of Patrice de Plunkett about Opus Dei, an institution of the Catholic Church. Plunkett was the editor of the French magazine Le Figaro. His book was released on 17 May 2006, the debut of the film The Da Vinci Code which portrayed Opus Dei in a negative light. The purpose of the book is to inform the public about the Catholic Church, Christianity and Opus Dei, and to understand the black legend against Opus Dei.

Purpose

According to Plunkett, the purpose of his book was to "re-inform our contemporaries" because "We are entering an era where Christianity is not known to the public." He sees that The Da Vinci Code sends the following message:

Opus Dei is a monster
Opus Dei is a product of the Church
The Church makes monsters

He believes that Opus Dei is a "concentrate" of what our times accuse the Roman Catholic Church of. By casting light on the daughter (Opus Dei), he said, he was casting light on the mother (the Catholic Church).

Plunkett begun his research when he found out that 31% of French readers believed in the contents of The Da Vinci Code, although he already had an initial idea of conducting an investigation when there was media consensus against the beatification of Josemaría Escrivá in 1992.

Content

The poor image of Opus Dei, Plunkett concluded, is due in part to the Opus Dei strategy of silence or "discretion". He is certain that members and officers of Opus Dei committed mistakes that contributed to this poor image. "But nothing, in fact, corresponds to the charges (even hugely improbable) that circulate against Opus Dei," he stated. The error of Opus Dei was to extend its system of "discretion" (born of the Spanish situation) beyond the borders of Spain. This gave Opus Dei an image of a secret society. The reason it fells into this error was its great confidence in the universality of its form of organization. And it took The Da Vinci Code for Opus Dei to understand how this discretion has harmed it.

Plunkett asserts that his investigation has led to surprising discoveries. "It is not the left that opened hostilities against Opus Dei but the extreme wing of the Francoist government in Spain of the 1940s, because Josemaria Escriva refused to integrate with the official ideology of the time! "Holy Mafia", "White freemasonry': all these terms which our present-day media make use of today when they speak of Opus Dei, have been forged in Spain for over sixty years by the newspapers of the Falange."

As to the reason why the black legends against Opus Dei ran across the decades, Plunkett provides this explanation:

From 1970 to the present, society projected its successive fantasies on Opus Dei, according to the "needs" of every era.
The 70s media brought back the idea of Opus Dei rightist mafia that was opposed to the ideas of 1968.
The 80s saw Opus Dei as representing the "cult" which was an enemy of individualistic hedonism and consumerism.
The 90s decided that the conservative shift of John Paul II can only be explained by a conspiracy hatched by Opus Dei.

After September 11, 2001, the media dressed up Opus Dei again into something else: "the secret network that is plotting the victory of the Christian West." European opinion leaders were threatened by Islam but didn't want to deal with it, and so they posed as critics of all fundamentalism in religion. They attribute this fundamentalism in the Catholic Church to Opus Dei.

Between 2001 and 2006, the myth of Opus Monster was fed by the appearance of Christianophobia or Catholic phobia in the wealthy Western societies, especially France. After September 11, our opinion leaders decided that all religions are dangerous. They searched among the Catholic groups what would embody the fundamentalism that they saw in Islamic groups. And they chose Opus Dei. This is the latest mutation of a virus containing a black legend.

Thus, Plunkett said that from age to age, society uses the myth of the Opus Dei monster for different reasons, even contradictory to each other. Opus Dei, the "enemy of today's values" for the Falange is still the "enemy of today's values" for the liberals.

 Enquête sur le « monstre » explains the success of Dan Brown's The Da Vinci Code on the popular image which has been carved through the decades, an image to which Dan Brown can easily add another layer, even darker and scarier, because the public has already been accustomed to see Opus Dei as a monster. Thus, Plunkett dedicates a chapter on conspiracy theories throughout the centuries: Jesuit conspiracy, Masonic conspiracy, Jewish conspiracy.

Plunkett is perplexed whether the monstrosity that scares both the rightist Spaniard of the 1940s and the contemporary journalist is really monstrous or it is Opus Dei's vision of life, the Catholic vision of life, something that escapes the "politically correct" of each era, i.e. those who are behave in ideologic conformity to an orthodox authority of a specific time.

Today, Plunkett sees Opus Dei has learned the lessons of The Da Vinci Code. It has learned that its traditional discretion has backfired, and that in this day and age transparency is security. "It is essential for people to understand who we exactly are, and what we do, and why we do what we do."

As to the nature of Opus Dei, he described it as a "service station", providing members and other active people some spiritual services which they ask for, providing advice, methods of prayer, study, evenings of reflection in small groups. Some of the "users" make a special contract to make a permanent bond between themselves and the service station.

Many of the members of Opus Dei are engaged in schools, universities, clinics, hospitals, and welfare centers. He also investigated the accusation on whether there is a financial octopus in Opus Dei, and also the well-known companies created by the laity of Opus Dei, managed by them according to its culture. He concluded that these companies do not belong to Opus Dei: the money from these corporations - charitable donations, the potential benefits - is not sent to Rome. If money was sent to Rome, these companies would go bankrupt, he said. One of the surprises in his investigation is that there is no evidence that Opus Dei functions as a "money pump".

Research process

According to Plunkett, Opus Dei was at first cautious about cooperating with the investigation but later on cooperated willingly when it was seen that the investigation was to their advantage due to the success of The Da Vinci Code.

He also investigated about Opus Dei in other sectors of the Catholic Church, including the Vatican and the dioceses with secular and anticlerical historians. He placed special emphasis on the younger generation of Spanish researchers. He also went to various countries of Europe and Latin America.

Footnotes

References
 Interview exclusif de Patrice de Plunkett, auteur d'une nouvelle enquête sur l'Opus Dei
 Zenit interview with Plunkett
 Interview in the Opus Dei page
 Entretin avec l'auteur de L'Opus Dei: enquete sur le monstre, Catholique.org
 Rendezvous Manque avec L'Opus Dei, La libre.be

External links
 Interview exclusif de Patrice de Plunkett, auteur d'une nouvelle enquête sur l'Opus Dei
 Zenit interview with Plunkett
 Interview in the Opus Dei page
 Da Vinci Codex.com
 Entretin avec l'auteur de L'Opus Dei: enquete sur le monstre, Catholique.org
 Rendezvous Manque avec L'Opus Dei, La libre.be

2006 non-fiction books
Books about Christianity
21st-century history books
History books about Catholicism
Opus Dei